Derobrachus brevicollis is a species of beetle in the family Cerambycidae. It was described by Jean Guillaume Audinet-Serville in 1832.

References

Prioninae
Beetles described in 1832